Pusa is a district, in Betong Division, Sarawak, Malaysia.

References